Alfaz in the principles of Islamic jurisprudence (Persian:الفاظ در علم اصول فقه) is a preliminary subject concerned with analysis of verbals and concepts due to acquiring religious judgments and sharia.These issues often deal with subjects in the fields of philosophy of language and semantics. The subject counteds as the oldest in the Principles of Islamic jurisprudence.

History
This discussion concerned with understanding of religious text. The subject also returns to the early of first centuries of Hijrah. Alfaz, at first, concerned with the book and after that, concerned with the reason of tradition. All discussions within Alfaz are not such a way that introduced to Alfaz suddenly but historically  included in the primitive parts of principles books. According to some scholars, the most ancient subject within Alfaz is universal and particular.

It is said that Ibn Idris shafeii is an establisher in explaining the subject of Alfaz. According to pakatchi, Shafeii in the book of Al resalah concerned with the subject of Alfaz. Also in third century, Ibn Ravandi had written the general and particular essay in which he deal with Alfaz.among the Zaheriah, Davood also refers to need to Alfaz subject. There was many essays among Zaheriah deal with Alfaz such as the book of Al khosus va Omum(the particular and universal) by Abu Ishaq Marvzi. Also there are many essays concerned with Alfaz among Shia like the book of Hisham ibn Hakam which didn’t survive. besides Shaykh Mofid wrote a comprehensive essay on Lafaz. Ibn Zohreh Halabi meanwhile begins the Alfaz with concerning with explaining subjects such as Amr and Nahy, particular and universal.

Description
In Fact Alfaz operate as a theory of designation and denoting. In other words, Alfaz considered as theory of denoting and how we could understand and found the meaning of words particularly religious texts. Alfaz primarily concerned with vocabs and its classification. These concerns are semiotical  and samantical issues. For example, Āmidī’s discussed of Alfaz in respect to semantical concepts such as those vowel sounds which have meaning and those which haven't.  often discussions of Principles of Islamic jurisprudence divided into four parts which the first one is concerned with linguistic subjects such as designation, use, absoluteness. etc. it seems that Alfaz in principles deals with a common sensical nature. Also there is a relation between Alfaz and hermeneutics.

Contemporary comments
One of the inventions in Alfaz was by Muhammad Baqir al-Sadr. He referred to the precedent of shia Osulis in discussion of Alfaz and the process of its analysis and subjects copula and designations of forms of Alfazs or verbals. Ruhollah Khomeini, according to definition of principles presented by him, believed that most of subjects in Alfaz such as identification of meaning of sentences and conception is out of science of principles.

See also

Principles of Islamic jurisprudence
shia islam

References

Sources

Islamic terminology